The Guggenheim family is an American-Jewish family known for making their fortune in the mining industry, in the early 20th century, especially in the United States and South America. After World War I, many family members withdrew from the businesses and became involved in philanthropy, especially in the arts, aviation, medicine, and culture.

History
Meyer Guggenheim, a Swiss citizen of Ashkenazi Jewish  ancestry, arrived in the United States in 1847. His surname was derived from the Alsatian village of Gugenheim. He married Barbara Meyer, whom he met in the United States. Over the next few decades, their several children and descendants became known for their global successes in mining and smelting businesses, under the name Guggenheim Exploration, including the American Smelting and Refining Company. In the early 20th century, the family developed one of the largest fortunes in the world.

Following World War I, they sold their global mining interests and later purchased nitrate mines in Chile. Subsequently, the family largely withdrew from direct involvement in running businesses. Family members became known for their philanthropy in diverse areas such as modern art, aviation, and medicine. They donated funds to develop Guggenheim Museums, the Guggenheim Aeronautical Laboratory, and the Guggenheim Pavilion at Mount Sinai Medical Center, designed by I. M. Pei in New York City.

Current interests
Guggenheim Partners today manages over $200 billion in assets. Another family vehicle, Guggenheim Investment Advisors, oversees about $50 billion in assets.

Family tree

Meyer Guggenheim (1828–1905) married Barbara Meyer, of German Jewish descent, in 1852. They met in the United States. They had eleven children together, including eight sons, five of whom were active in the family businesses: Isaac, Daniel, Maurice "Murry", Solomon Robert, and (John) Simon Guggenheim. Sons Benjamin, Robert and William pursued other careers. The daughters were Jeanette, Rose and Cora. Meyer's 11 children, their spouses, and notable descendants are shown below:

 Meyer Guggenheim (1828–1905), m. Barbara Meyer (1834–1900) (m. 1852–her death)
 Isaac Guggenheim (1854–1922), m. Carrie Sonneborn (1859–1933) (m. 1876–his death)
 Beulah V. Guggenheim (1877–1960), m. William I. Spiegelberg
 Edyth B. Guggenheim (1880–1960), m. Louis M. Josephthal, future admiral and founder of Josephthal & Co.
 Audrey Josephthal (1903–2003) m. Cornelius Ruxton Love, Jr. (died 1971)
 Iris Love (1933–2020)
 Helene Guggenheim (1886–1962)
 m. Edmund L. Haas (m. 1905; div.)
 m. Corlette Glorney
 m. Lord Melvill Ward
 Daniel Guggenheim (1856–1930), became head of the family after his father's death; m. Florence Shloss (1863–1944) (m. 1884–his death)
 Meyer Robert Guggenheim (1885–1959)
 Harry Frank Guggenheim (1890–1971)
 Diane Guggenheim (1924–1991)
 Gladys Eleanor Guggenheim (1895–1980), m. Roger Williams Straus (1891–1957) (m. 1914–his death)
 Roger Williams Straus, Jr. (1917–2004), a founder and chairman of Farrar, Straus and Giroux, publishers
Roger Williams Straus III (1943–)
 Maurice "Murry" Guggenheim (1858–1939), m. Leonie Bernheim (1865–1959) (m. 1887–his death)
 Edmond A. Guggenheim (1888–1972), m. Marion Price (1888–1992)
 Lucille Guggenheim (1894–1972), m. Frederic Adam Gimbel (1891–1996), div. 
 Solomon R. Guggenheim (1861–1949), founded the Solomon R. Guggenheim Museum and Foundation; m. Irene M. Rothschild (1868–1954), daughter of Victor Henry Rothschild (m. 1895–his death)
 Eleanor Mary Guggenheim (1896–1992), m. Arthur Stuart, 7th Earl Castle Stewart (1889–1961) (m. 1920–his death)
 David Stuart, Viscount Stuart (1921–1942)
 Robert Stuart, Viscount Stuart (1923–1944)
 Arthur Stuart, 8th Earl Castle Stewart (1928–)
 Andrew Stewart, Viscount Stuart (1953–)
 The Honorable Simon Stuart (1930–2002)
 Gertrude R. Guggenheim (1898–1966)
 Barbara Josephine Guggenheim (1904–1985), married John Lawson-Johnston of the family producing Bovril
 Peter Lawson-Johnston, President Guggenheim Museum, founder Guggenheim Partners 
 Jeanette Guggenheim (1863–1889), m. Albert M. Gerstle (1860–1896)
 Nettie Gerstle (1889–?)
 Benjamin Guggenheim (1865–1912), died in the Titanic disaster; m. Florette Seligman (1870–1937) (m. 1895–his death)
 Benita Rosalind Guggenheim (1895–1927)
 Marguerite "Peggy" Guggenheim (1898–1979), founded the Peggy Guggenheim Collection in Venice
 m. Laurence Vail (div. 1928)
 Michael Cedric Sindbad Vail (1923–1986), m. Margaret Angela Vail (m. 1957–his death)
 Karole Vail (1959–)
 Pegeen Vail Guggenheim (1925–1967)
 m. Jean Hélion (1904–1987) (m. 1946; div. 1956)
 Fabrice Hélion
 Nicolas Hélion
 Davide Hélion
 m. Ralph Rumney (1934–2002) (m. 1958–her death)
 Sandro Rumney (b. 1958)
 m. Max Ernst (1891–1976) (m. 1941; div. 1946)
 Barbara Hazel Guggenheim (1903–1995),
 m. Sigmund Marshall Kempner (m. 1921; div. 1922)
 m. Milton S. Waldman (m. 1923; div. 1930)
 Terrence Waldman (1924–1928)
 Benjamin Waldman (1927–1928)
 Terrence (four-and-a-half years old) and Benjamin (fourteen months) both fell to their deaths from the roof of the Surrey, a sixteen-story apartment hotel at 20 East Seventy-sixth Street, New York, on October 19, 1928.
 m. Denys King-Farlow (Hugh St. Denys Nettleton King-Farlow) (m. 1930; div.)
 John King-Farlow (1932–2002)
 Barbara Benita King-Farlow (1934–?)
 Ghislaine Agostini
 Amelia Kaye
 Adam Jacobs
 m. Charles Everett McKinley, Jr. (d. 1942) (m. ?–his death)
 m. Archibald Butt Jr. (div.)
 m. Larry Leonard (div.)
 Robert Guggenheim (1867–1876)
 (John) Simon Guggenheim (1867–1941), elected as a U.S. Senator from Colorado; m. Olga Hirsch (1877–1970) (m. 1898–his death)
 John Simon Guggenheim (1905–1922)
 George Denver Guggenheim (1907–1939)
 William Guggenheim (1868–1941)
 m. Grace Brown Herbert (m. 1900; div. 1901)
 m. Aimee Lillian Steinberger (m. 1904–his death)
 William Guggenheim, Jr. (1907–1947), m. Elizabeth Newell (m. 1937–his death) [she later m. William J. Broadhurst]
 William Guggenheim III (1939– ) 
 m. Grace Embury (div.)
 Maire Guggenheim
 Jaenet Guggenheim
 m. Judith Arnold
 William Douglas Guggenheim (1970– ) 
 m. Traci Aikey (1978– )
 Lilian Grace Guggenheim (2009– )
 Katherine Joy Guggenheim (2010– ) 
 Emily Faith Guggenheim (2013– )
 Christopher Mark Guggenheim (1976– )
 Jonathan Paul Guggenheim (1978– )
 Rose Guggenheim (1871–1945), m. Albert Loeb, the nephew of Solomon Loeb
 Harold A. Loeb (1891–1974)
 Edwin M. Loeb (1894–1966)
 Willard E. Loeb (1896–1958)
 Cora Guggenheim (1873–1956), m. Louis F. Rothschild (1869–1957), founder of L.F. Rothschild
 Louis F. Rothschild, Jr. (1900–1902)
 Muriel Barbara Rothschild (1903–1999), m. William Donald Scott
 Gwendolyn Fay Rothschild (1906–1983)

References

Further reading

External links 
 Daniel and Florence Guggenheim Foundation
 Guggenheim Partners, LLC
 

 
American people of Swiss-Jewish descent
Business families of the United States
American mining businesspeople
Jewish-American families
Distinguished Service to Music Medal recipients